Middle Bass is an unincorporated community in Put-in-Bay Township, Ottawa County, Ohio, United States. It is the only community on Middle Bass Island in Lake Erie. It has a post office with the ZIP code 43446.

References 

Unincorporated communities in Ohio
Unincorporated communities in Ottawa County, Ohio